Miniopterus fossilis is a fossil bat in the genus Miniopterus. It existed in what is now Slovakia during the Miocene period. It was first named by Zapfe in 1950.

References

Miniopteridae
Miocene bats
Fossil taxa described in 1950
Miocene mammals of Europe